Adam Golde (died 1395/6), of Exeter, Devon, was an English politician.

Family
He married a woman named Margery and they had four daughters and one son, the MP, Roger Golde.

Career
He was a Member (MP) of the Parliament of England for Exeter in January 1390.

References

Year of birth unknown
1396 deaths
English MPs January 1390
Members of the Parliament of England (pre-1707) for Exeter